Albert Reynolds (born 28 March 1988) is a Saint Lucian javelin thrower. Reynolds was born in Castries, and grew up in Babonneau.

Reynolds holds the Saint Lucia national record and Organisation of Eastern Caribbean States record for men's javelin throw, throwing  at the 2015 NACAC Championships in Athletics in San Jose, Costa Rica, winning the bronze medal. He is the first Saint Lucian to hold the OECS record for Javelin Throw.

Reynolds attended Babonneau Secondary School and was Saint Lucia's high school champion. He went on to win gold at the 2007 CARIFTA Games.

At the senior level, Reynolds has represented Saint Lucia at the Commonwealth Games, Central American and Caribbean Games, Central American and Caribbean Championships, Pan American Sports Festival, Organisation of Eastern Caribbean States Championships, and North and Central American and Caribbean Championships. He has won medals at the OECS Championships and NACAC Championships.

In 2013 and 2014, Reynolds was named Senior Athlete Of The Year by the Saint Lucia Athletics Association.

Since 2015, Reynolds has trained under Roger Gravenois of Club Asco Inter Atlas in the French overseas department of Martinique.

At the 2019 World Athletics Championships, Reynolds finished 29th.

Record

References

External links
 
 Albert Reynolds at the 2019 Pan American Games

1988 births
Living people
Saint Lucian javelin throwers
Saint Lucian male athletes
Athletes (track and field) at the 2010 Commonwealth Games
Athletes (track and field) at the 2014 Commonwealth Games
Athletes (track and field) at the 2018 Commonwealth Games
Commonwealth Games competitors for Saint Lucia
Competitors at the 2010 Central American and Caribbean Games
Competitors at the 2018 Central American and Caribbean Games
Athletes (track and field) at the 2019 Pan American Games
Pan American Games bronze medalists for Saint Lucia
Pan American Games medalists in athletics (track and field)
Medalists at the 2019 Pan American Games